The Rawson Mountains lie within the Queen Maud Mountains to the southeast of the Ross Ice Shelf. They stand between the head of the Amundsen and Scott Glaciers. Peaks within the range include Mount Wyatt (2930 m) and Mount Weaver (2780 m).

Features
Geographical features include:

 Amundsen Glacier
 Mount Weaver
 Mount Wyatt
 Scott Glacier

Mountain ranges of the Ross Dependency
Amundsen Coast